Arlequin may refer to:

 Harlequin, also spelled Arlequin, a comic servant character
 Arlequin (band), a Japanese rock band
 Arlequin (software), population genetics software
 L'Arlequin, a cinema in Paris
 Los Arlequíns, Mexican pro-wrestlers
 Arlequin, Pièce Caractèristique Pour Clarinette Seule, by Louis Cahuzac
 Cinysca arlequin (C. arlequin) a species of sea snail

See also

 Arlequinus, a genus of frogs

 
 Harlequin (disambiguation)